Mount Hpan Pu (also spelled as Hpar Pu or Hpa Pu, ဖားပုတောင်) is a hill with an elevation of 99 metres (324 ft), located to the north of Hpa-An, Kayin State in Myanmar. At the summit of Hpan Pu Hill, a golden pagoda marks the top. Mount Hpan Pu is a tourist destination and known for its views of the incredible landscapes. The trail to the top is 2.5 km long.

Legend

According to legend, King Mandu (မဏ္ဍုဖားမင်းကြီး), a giant frog, lived on the top of Mount Hpan Pu. One day, while out searching for food, he saw a large magic ruby with an emerald club placed on the throne in the foot cave of the hill, and the frog king thought the ruby was his food and swallowed it. He gained powers by swallowing the magic ruby and was able to resist his enemy, the dragon king. The place where the dragon king vomited the frog king is called Hpa-An (lit. 'vomit frog'). The impressive statues of these figures can be seen in the Shwe Yin Myaw Pagoda's compound.

References 

Hills of Myanmar
Buddhist pilgrimage sites in Myanmar